Kim Sang-won (born 20 February 1992) is a South Korean footballer who plays as defender for Suwon FC.

Career
He was selected by Jeju United in the 2014 K League draft.

References

External links 

1992 births
Living people
Association football defenders
South Korean footballers
Jeju United FC players
Gwangju FC players
FC Anyang players
Pohang Steelers players
K League 1 players
K League 2 players
University of Ulsan alumni
Sportspeople from Jeju Province